Tunisia competed in the 2020 Summer Paralympics in Tokyo, Japan from 24 August to 5 September, 2021.

Medalists

Competitors
The following is the list of number of competitors participating in the Games:

Athletics 

23 people in 34 events such as Rima Abdelli, Walid Ktila, Mohamed Farhat Chida, Yassine Gharbi, Sonia Mansour, Raoua Tlili and Hania Aidi are among the athletes to represent Tunisia at the 2020 Summer Paralympics.

Table tennis

One male competitor has been selected to compete in the Paralympics after winning in the African Para Table Tennis Championships in Alexandria. This will be the first time that Tunisia will be competing in table tennis at the Games.

Triathlon

See also
Tunisia at the Paralympics
Tunisia at the 2020 Summer Olympics

References

Nations at the 2020 Summer Paralympics
2020
2021 in Tunisian sport